The 2003 Purefoods Tender Juicy Hotdogs season was the 16th season of the franchise in the Philippine Basketball Association (PBA).

Draft picks

Transactions

Occurrences
Coach Eric Altamirano steps down and was replaced by Ryan Gregorio, who steered the hotdogs to a title last season.

Ronnie Magsanoc retires from active playing to concentrate on assisting the head coach on the Purefoods bench.

Roster

Game results

All-Filipino Cup

References

 

Magnolia Hotshots seasons
Purefoods